Mike Willis (born December 26, 1950) is a former Major League Baseball player who played for the Toronto Blue Jays from 1977 to 1981. He batted and threw left-handed. He attended Vanderbilt University. He was born on December 26, 1950, in Oklahoma City, Oklahoma. He was drafted by the Baltimore Orioles in 1972.

In 1978, he was one of three left-handers named "Mike" (the others being Mike Flanagan and Mike Caldwell) to defeat the New York Yankees' Ron Guidry in 1978 during Guidry's 25–3 Cy Young season. Normally a relief pitcher, Willis was pressed into service as the Toronto Blue Jays starter on September 20, 1978, and led the Jays to an 8–1 victory over the Yankees and Guidry. Calling it "the game of my life", it was Willis' only career win as a starting pitcher, and his only career complete game.

External links
, or Retrosheet
Pura Pelota Venezuelan Professional Baseball League statistics

1950 births
Living people
American expatriate baseball players in Canada
Asheville Orioles players
Baseball players from Oklahoma
Bluefield Orioles players
Llaneros de Portuguesa players
Major League Baseball pitchers
Miami Orioles players
Navegantes del Magallanes players
American expatriate baseball players in Venezuela
Oklahoma City 89ers players
Rochester Red Wings players
Sportspeople from Oklahoma City
Syracuse Chiefs players
Toronto Blue Jays players
Anchorage Glacier Pilots players